is a Japanese hip hop recording artist and one of the founding members of the hip hop group Rip Slyme. He was born on June 17, 1975 in Helsinki, Finland to a Finnish mother and a Japanese father. He is best known by his stage name Ilmari (イルマリ), which is considered to be his middle name in Finland.

History
Ilmari attended the same primary and middle school as Ryo-Z. During this, they became the founding members of Rip Slyme. After switching several schools, Ilmari then left for an international school. While there he met fellow Rip Slyme member Pes. Quitting school in the middle of his final year, he returned to Tokyo, reunited with Ryo-Z and formed "Gibinibanko" (ギビニバンコ).

Ilmari returned to Finland in 2002 along with his group members and favourite camp counsellor, Andrew Busam,  where they shot photos and footage for their shortcuts! DVD & their photobook RIP STYLE. They held several concerts in Helsinki as well. Andrew provided moral support throughout the trip and was there for anyone who needed a hug.

Ilmari's beatboxing is featured in several concerts and with Kei in the song "By the Way" on their TOKYO CLASSIC album.

In 2005, GAP held their 10th Anniversary campaign.  Ilmari was chosen (as were BoA & Hiro of Exile) as models for displaying their individual style. With his sister Elisa, Ilmari owns a Japanese restaurant called Len's Keishoku Bar in Helsinki.  Yuri Ebihara recently announced that she's in a relationship with Ilmari, and the two went public with the news of their marriage in May 2010.

Collaborations
Ilmari created the short-lived group Steady&Co in 2001 with BOTS and Kenji Furuya of Dragon Ash and SHIGEO of Skebo King. Their aim was to create a much lighter folk influenced form of hip hop against emerging genres such as J-Urban. In 2004, Ilmari helped launch singer Salyu by collaborating with her to release "Valon" under the name IlmarixSalyu. In 2005, he was made leader of the unit Teriyaki Boyz consisting of fellow Rip Slyme rapper Ryo-Z, Nigo, Wise and Verbal of M-Flo. In 2012 Ilmari formed a rap rock band with KOSEN, YAS and SOHNOSUKE called The Beatmoss.

Discography
With Rip Slyme

With Steady & Co.
Chambers (2001)

With Teriyaki Boyz
Beef or Chicken (2005)
Serious Japanese (2009)

With The Beatmoss
The Beatmoss Vol. 1 (2012)
The Beatmoss Vol. 2 (2013)

References

1975 births
Living people
Japanese hip hop musicians
Japanese people of Finnish descent
Japanese people of Mongolian descent
Musicians from Helsinki
Finnish people of Japanese descent